Đurasović (also transliterated Djurasović) is a Serbo-Croatian surname. Notable people with the surname include:

 Aleksa Đurasović (born 2002), Serbian footballer
 Božo Đurasović (born 1997), Bosnian basketball player
 Nikola Đurasović (born 1983), Serbian basketball player
 Veselin Đurasović (born 1957), former Bosnian footballer
 Viktor Durasovic (born 1997), Norwegian tennis player

Bosnian surnames
Serbian surnames
Slavic-language surnames
Patronymic surnames